USS Robert E. Simanek (ESB-7) will be a  for the United States Navy, and she is the first United States Navy vessel named after Marine Corps Private First Class Robert Ernest Simanek, who was awarded for the Medal of Honor for heroic actions during the Battle of Bunker Hill, August 1952, during the Korean War. Secretary of the Navy Kenneth Braithwaite officially announced the name on 15 January 2021, when he visited , the oldest U.S. Navy commissioned ship afloat.

NASSCO laid the keel for the ship, without  ceremony, in San Diego on 27 May 2022. An official keel authentication ceremony was held on 21 October of the same year.

References
 

 

Lewis B. Puller-class expeditionary mobile base
Montford Point-class mobile landing platforms
Auxiliary ships of the United States Navy
Ships built in San Diego